Maniyar Dam is a masonry gravity dam located on the Kakkattar River in the Indian state of Kerala. It is located in Maniyar, Pathanamthitta.

References

Gravity dams
Dams in Kerala
Year of establishment missing